My Big Fat American Gypsy Wedding is an American reality television series that debuted on the TLC in April 2012. It claims to revolve around the marriage customs of Romani-Americans ("Gypsies") – allegedly members of Romanichal clans, although some are actually of Irish Traveller descent. It is a spin-off of Britain's Channel 4 series Big Fat Gypsy Weddings.

It was announced in June 2012 that the series had been renewed for a second season, which debuted March 24, 2013. Season 4 premiered April 4, 2014 and Season 5 in February 2015.

My Big Fat American Gypsy Wedding has led to a spinoff series: Gypsy Sisters (2013).

Controversies 
Both the British original and the American version of the series have faced a number of controversies, including allegations of racism in its advertising  and causing racially motivated bullying.
The Romani Gypsy community has criticized the series for misrepresenting the ethnic minority with non-Romani characters posing as “Gypsy”, and Billy Welch – a spokesman for Romani Gypsies – stated: 
The American version of the series has faced controversy and criticism from Romani-Americans, and from journalists and activists concerned with minority rights, claiming that the series is “wildly misleading,” cultivating racist stereotypes, and misrepresenting the American Romani community.

Episodes

Series overview

Season 1 (2012)

Season 2 (2013)

Season 3 (2014)

Season 4 (2015)

Season 5 (2016)

Season 6 (2018)

Specials

References

2010s American reality television series
2012 American television series debuts
2016 American television series debuts
English-language television shows
Romani in the United States
TLC (TV network) original programming
Wedding television shows
Romani mass media
Romanichal
Reality television spin-offs
American television spin-offs